Hervé Kage (born 10 April 1989) is a Congolese footballer who plays for Belgian First Division B side Virton as winger.

Career
Kage began his career in the youth side with FC ASSE-Zellik 2002 and was in summer 2004 scouted from Anderlecht. On 24 January 2007 left Anderlecht and joined on loan to Eredivisie team Waalwijk. After only two games with Waalwijk in the half-year that he was there, Kage returned to Anderlecht. On 31 January 2008, he was loaned out to farm team Union SG.

After few years with Anderlecht, Kage signed a two years contract on 17 June 2009 with Charleroi.

Before signing a contract at Gent in January 2013 Kage was loaned out to Beitar Jerusalem in 2011.

In July 2014 he joined Genk.

On 29 January 2022, Kage returned to Belgium and signed with Virton.

International
Kage was member of the DR Congo national under-23 football team, and later apart of the DR Congo national football team at the 2015 African Cup of Nations. Kage debuted for DR Congo in an friendly against Cameroon on 7 January 2015.

International stats

Honours

Club
Charleroi
Belgian Second Division: 2011–12

National
DR Congo
Africa Cup of Nations bronze: 2015

References

External links
 Footgoal Profile

1989 births
Living people
Footballers from Kinshasa
R.S.C. Anderlecht players
Democratic Republic of the Congo footballers
Democratic Republic of the Congo international footballers
Belgian footballers
Belgium youth international footballers
Belgium under-21 international footballers
Belgian sportspeople of Democratic Republic of the Congo descent
RKC Waalwijk players
R. Charleroi S.C. players
Royale Union Saint-Gilloise players
Beitar Jerusalem F.C. players
K.A.A. Gent players
K.R.C. Genk players
K.V. Kortrijk players
Kardemir Karabükspor footballers
Adana Demirspor footballers
FC Botoșani players
R.E. Virton players
Belgian Pro League players
Israeli Premier League players
Challenger Pro League players
Eredivisie players
Süper Lig players
Liga I players
Expatriate footballers in the Netherlands
Expatriate footballers in Israel
Expatriate footballers in Romania
Association football defenders
Democratic Republic of the Congo emigrants to Belgium
2015 Africa Cup of Nations players